Carol Martin "Bill" Gatton (May 25, 1932 – April 18, 2022) was an American entrepreneur and philanthropist.

Gatton was born near Bremen, Kentucky, on May 25, 1932. He earned his B.S. in 1954 from the University of Kentucky. In addition to his degree from UK, he held an M.B.A. in finance and banking from the Wharton School of the University of Pennsylvania.  His start as an entrepreneur began as president and general manager of Bill Gatton Motors in Owensboro, Kentucky, in 1959. Today, the Bill Gatton Automotive Group includes Chevrolet-Cadillac, Honda and Nissan dealerships in Bristol, Tennessee, and an Acura-Mazda dealership in Johnson City, Tennessee.
 
In 1995, Gatton made a multimillion-dollar gift to the College of Business and Economics at UK, the largest gift ever made to the university prior to 2022. In his honor, the UK Board of Trustees later renamed the college "The Carol Martin Gatton College of Business and Economics." Opened in 2006, the East Tennessee State University Bill Gatton College of Pharmacy is also the namesake of Mr. Gatton.  Gatton also donated a large sum of money to the formation of the gifted academy at Western Kentucky, opened in 2007 as the Carol Martin Gatton Academy of Mathematics and Science, where high school students could finish their last two years of high school taking rigorous college classes. In February 2022, the University of Kentucky announced a $5 million gift from Gatton. This is the single largest scholarship gift UK has ever received, and Gatton remains the university’s single largest donor.

References

External links
UK Alumni Association Biography
Gatton College of Business and Economics - University of Kentucky
Gatton College of Pharmacy - East Tennessee State University
Bill Gatton Chevrolet-Cadillac
Gatton Honda

1932 births
2022 deaths
American automobile salespeople
American philanthropists
University of Kentucky alumni
Wharton School of the University of Pennsylvania alumni
People from Muhlenberg County, Kentucky
Businesspeople from Kentucky